Alexandre Dgebuadze (born 21 May 1971) is a Georgian-born Belgian chess player who played for Georgia until 2000.  He was awarded the title of Grandmaster by FIDE in 2000.

Chess career
He has won the Georgian Chess Championship in 1990, and the Belgian Chess Championship four times; in 2002, 2005, 2007 and 2020.

He earned the Belgian federation spot to qualify for the Chess World Cup 2021 and will face Kiril Georgiev in the first round.

References

External links

Alexandre Dgebuadze chess games at 365Chess.com

1971 births
Living people
Chess grandmasters
Soviet chess players
Chess players from Georgia (country)
Belgian chess players